Mikhail Mikhailovich Mustygin (27 October 1937 – 27 January 2023) was a Soviet and Belarusian footballer who played as a striker.

Career
Mustygin started his career with FC Avangard Kolomna.

Mustygin was the top scorer of the 1962 Soviet Top League with 17 goals scored, and of the 1967 Soviet Top League with 19 goals.

Mustygin won the bronze medal with Dinamo Minsk in the 1963 Soviet Top League, and was included in the top-33-players year-end list in both 1963 and 1967.

References

External links
 

1937 births
2023 deaths
People from Kolomna
Sportspeople from Moscow Oblast
Soviet footballers
Belarusian footballers
Association football forwards
Soviet Top League players
PFC CSKA Moscow players
FC Dinamo Minsk players